The Battle of Ménfő was an important battle in the early history of the Kingdom of Hungary. Fought in 1044 at Ménfő, near Győr, between an army of mostly Germans and Hungarians (Magyars), it was a victory for the Germans and thus for Westernising influences in Hungary.

Peter Orseolo, who had been deposed by Samuel Aba in 1041, returned with the assistance of Emperor Henry III, and invaded Hungary in June 1044. His force was small and the Hungarian army of Samuel Aba was large. However, there was disaffection in the Hungarian ranks and the army quickly fell apart in the face of the German cavalry. Samuel fled the field, but was captured and killed. Peter was reinstalled as king at Székesfehérvár and did homage for his kingdom to Henry. The leading magnates and the less important nobles all came to Henry to make oaths of fidelity and vassalage. Hungary was made a vassal of the Holy Roman Empire, though it was not to remain so for long.

Sources

Gwatkin, H. M., Whitney, J. P. (ed) et al. The Cambridge Medieval History: Volume III. Cambridge University Press, 1926.

Menfo
Menfo
Menfo
Conflicts in 1044
1044 in Europe